The 1999–2000 Australian Figure Skating Championships was held in Thebarton from 24 through 31 July 1999. Skaters competed in the disciplines of men's singles, ladies' singles, pair skating, and ice dancing across many levels, including senior, junior, novice, adult, and the pre-novice disciplines of primary and intermediate.

Senior results

Men

Ladies

Pairs

Ice dancing

External links
 results

1999 in figure skating
2000 in figure skating
Fig
Fig
Australian Figure Skating Championships